Fyodor Alexandrovich Lesh, alternatively spelled as Lösch (1840–1903), was a Russian Empire medical doctor.

He is credited with identifying Amoeba coli in 1875. This species was later classified in the genus Entamoeba.

References

1840 births
1903 deaths
Physicians from the Russian Empire